Paul Giblin is an American investigative journalist based in Phoenix, Arizona.

He graduated from University of Arizona in 1988.
He worked for the East Valley Tribune in Mesa, Arizona.
He writes for the Arizona Guardian. 
He is a civilian spokesman for the U.S. Army Corps of Engineers Afghanistan.

Giblin and Ryan Gabrielson won a Pulitzer Prize for Local Reporting in 2009, with the East Valley Tribune, citing "their adroit use of limited resources to reveal, in print and online, how a popular sheriff's focus on immigration enforcement endangered investigation of violent crime and other aspects of public safety."

Giblin also won a George Polk Award for Justice Reporting in 2008.

Works
"Friction After Patrols in Phoenix Immigrant Area", The New York Times, March 23, 2008

See also

References

External links
 

American male journalists
Pulitzer Prize for Local Reporting winners
George Polk Award recipients
University of Arizona alumni
Living people
Year of birth missing (living people)
Place of birth missing (living people)